Somió is a parish (parroquia rural in Spanish) of the municipality of Gijón / Xixón, in Asturias, Spain.

Civil parishes are the legal subdivisions of the municipalities under the current statute of autonomy of Asturias.

Its population was 6,800 in 2001 and 7,441 in 2012.

Somió is a coastal and residential district which borders the municipality of Villaviciosa in the east.

Neighborhoods and places
Somió nowadays includes 10 neighborhoods (that's the reason for the flag of Somió to have a 10-pointed star):
Fuejo
La Pipa
El Pisón
La Corolla
San Lorenzo
Las Caserías
La Redonda
Fontanía-La Guía
Fojanes
Candanal

Beaches

Within the district, there are the following beaches:

La Ñora
Estaño
Serín
Peñarrubia (nude beach)
El Rinconín

References

External links
 "San Julián" de Somió - Neighborhood association official website
 Official Toponyms - Principality of Asturias website.
 Official Toponyms: Laws - BOPA Nº 229 - Martes, 3 de octubre de 2006 & ''DECRETO 105/2006, de 20 de septiembre, por el que se determinan los topónimos oficiales del concejo de Gijón."

Parishes in Gijón